Yasuhiko Nagatoshi is a former US national champion in judo. In the 1967 US National Championships, Nagatoshi won grand champion and the gold medal in the under 80 kg division.  He was a bronze medalist in the 1968 National Championships.

Nagatoshi first came to America via an exchange program to Norwalk. He currently holds the rank of 7th dan. Nagatoshi was the Olympic alternate for Japan.

References

Japanese male judoka
American male judoka